Plakarthrium is a genus of crustaceans belonging to the monotypic family Plakarthriidae.

The species of this genus are found in southernmost South Hemisphere.

Species:

Plakarthrium australiense 
Plakarthrium punctatissimum 
Plakarthrium typicum

References

Isopoda